The Meyers 200 is a single-engined light aircraft produced in the United States in the 1950s and 1960s.

Design
It was the brainchild of Al Meyers and was a development of his Meyers MAC-145 design.  The holder of a number of speed records in its class, the Meyers 200 is widely admired for its clean lines, and is also known for its exceptionally sturdy airframe.  This strength is derived from a tubular 4130 chrome-moly steel truss structure with aluminum skin that protects occupants.

Acquisition by Aero Commander
In 1966, the Aero Commander division of North American Rockwell purchased the rights to the Meyers 145 and 200, as part of a strategy to capture a share of the light aircraft market in the United States.  During this time it was in the James Bond film You Only Live Twice. Known briefly as the Aero Commander 200, it soon emerged that the firm could not produce the design economically.  Meyers' firm had been virtually hand-building each aircraft and no jigs or tooling for the kind of mass production envisaged by Aero Commander even existed at the time the rights were bought.  Having spent US$4 million to produce just US$3 million worth of product, Aero Commander ceased production in 1968 and sold the rights to the Interceptor Corporation, which developed a turboprop-powered version as the Interceptor 400.  Ownership of the rights eventually passed to Prop-Jets, Inc., later known as Interceptor Aircraft Corporation.  In 2014 the Global Parts Group, via a separately formed affiliate company called Interceptor Aviation Inc, purchased the rights along with all associated assets and intellectual property related to the Meyers 200 and Interceptor 400 model aircraft.

Operational service
The Meyers 200D has never had an in-flight structural failure and has never had an FAA mandated Airworthiness Directive (AD) issued against the airframe.  The 4130 chrome-moly steel tubular roll cage and understructure act like a race car protective cage during a crash. Several Meyers aircraft have been forced down in the trees and off airport runways with documented instances of the occupants walking away with only minor injuries or a broken bone.

Variants

Meyers

 200 — single prototype powered by Continental O-470
 200A — production version powered by Continental IO-470 (11 built)
 200B — (17 built)
 200C — raised roof-line and larger windshield (9 built)
 200D — engine replaced with Continental IO-520A and flush riveted wings (8 built)

Aero Commander

 200 — Aero Commander version of the 200D (77 built) 
 200 — Aero Commander version of the 200E (1 prototype built)
 T200E — experimental twin-engine conversion - never built

Interceptor
 400 — Turboprop based on the 200

Specifications (Meyers 200D)

See also
Related development:
Interceptor 400
Meyers MAC-145

Comparable aircraft:
Beechcraft Bonanza
Bellanca Viking
Johnson Rocket 185
Ryan Navion

References

External links

 Meyers Aircraft Home Page
 Aviation Journalist Bud Davisson's review of the Meyers 200D
 AVweb used aircraft review

1950s United States civil utility aircraft
200
200
Single-engined tractor aircraft
Low-wing aircraft
Aircraft first flown in 1955